The Aşiyan Asri Cemetery is a burial ground situated on Aşiyan between the Bebek and Rumelihisarı neighborhoods of the European part of Istanbul, Turkey.

Many renowned intellectuals, writers and artists rest in this small cemetery, which has a panoramic view of the Bosporus.

Notable burials 
Listed by year of death:
 Ahmet Vefik Paşa (1823–1891), grand vezir, historian, linguist
 Tevfik Fikret (1867–1915), poet
 Bedia Muvahhit (1896–1994), actress
 Nigâr Hanım (1856–1918), poet
 Ömer Fahreddin Pasha (1868–1948), Ottoman (then kemalist) military leader and governor of Medina
 Orhan Veli Kanık (1914–1950), poet
 Yahya Kemal Beyatlı (1884–1958), poet
 Ahmet Hamdi Tanpınar (1901–1962), novelist
 Rukiye Sabiha Sultan (1894–1971), third daughter of Ottoman Empire's last sultan Mehmed VI and his first wife Nazikeda Kadın
 Adalet Cimcoz (1910–1970), voice actress, art curator, critic, translator, gossip columnist
 Tevfik Rüştü Aras (1883–1972) Minister of Foreign Affairs and diplomat
 Gündüz Kılıç (1919–1980) football player and coach
 Münir Nurettin Selçuk (1900–1981), musician, tenor singer
 Tezer Özlü (1943–1986), writer
 Sadi Irmak (1904–1990), academician, prime minister (1974–1975)
 Tarık Zafer Tunaya (1916–1991), lawyer, academician
 Abidin Dino (1913–1993), painter  (without headstone as wished by himself)
 Cihat Arman (1919–1994), football player
 Mehmet Ali Aybar (1908–1995), politician
 Onat Kutlar (1936–1995), writer, poet, founder of Turkish Sinematek
 Mina Urgan (1916–2000), academic, translator, writer and politician
 Fatma Neslişah Sultan (1921–2002), daughter of Princess Sabiha
 Avni Arbaş (1919–2003), painter
 Attila İlhan (1925–2005), poet, journalist
 Erdoğan Teziç (1936–2017), academic, jurist

 Yıldız Kenter (1928–2019), actress
 Doğan Cüceloğlu (1938–2021), psychologist, nonfiction writer

External links
 

Cemeteries in Istanbul
Bosphorus
Beşiktaş
Sunni cemeteries